A reading disability is a condition in which a person displays difficulty reading. Examples of reading disabilities include: developmental dyslexia, alexia (acquired dyslexia), and hyperlexia (word-reading ability well above normal for age and IQ).

Definition

The National Institute of Neurological Disorders and Stroke defines reading disability or dyslexia as follows: "Dyslexia is a brain-based type of learning disability that specifically impairs a person's ability to read. These individuals typically read at levels significantly lower than expected despite having normal intelligence. Although the disorder varies from person to person, common characteristics among people with dyslexia are difficulty with spelling, phonological processing (the manipulation of sounds), and rapid visual-verbal responding. In adults, dyslexia usually occurs after a brain injury or in the context of dementia. It can also be inherited in some families, and recent studies have identified a number of genes that may predispose an individual to developing dyslexia."
The NINDS definition is not in keeping with the bulk of scientific studies that conclude that there is no evidence to suggest that dyslexia and intelligence are related. Definition is more in keeping with modern research and debunked discrepancy model of dyslexia diagnosis:
Dyslexia is a learning difficulty that primarily affects the skills involved in accurate and fluent word reading and spelling.
Characteristic features of dyslexia are difficulties in phonological awareness, verbal memory and verbal processing speed.
Dyslexia occurs across the range of intellectual abilities.
It is best thought of as a continuum, not a distinct category, and there are no clear cut-off points.
Co-occurring difficulties may be seen in aspects of language, motor coordination, mental calculation, concentration and personal organisation, but these are not, by themselves, markers of dyslexia.
A good indication of the severity and persistence of dyslexic difficulties can be gained by examining how the individual responds or has responded to well-founded intervention.

Reading disabilities

Dyslexia

Dyslexia is a learning disability that manifests itself as a difficulty with word decoding and reading fluency. Comprehension may be affected as a result of difficulties with decoding, but is not a primary feature of dyslexia. It is separate and distinct from reading difficulties resulting from other causes, such as a non-neurological deficiency with vision or hearing, or from poor or inadequate reading instruction. It is estimated that dyslexia affects between 5–17% of the population. Dyslexia has been proposed to have three cognitive subtypes (auditory, visual and attentional), although individual cases of dyslexia are better explained by the underlying neuropsychological deficits and co-occurring learning disabilities (e.g. attention-deficit/hyperactivity disorder, math disability, etc.).  Although not an intellectual disability, it is considered both a learning disability and a reading disability.
Dyslexia and IQ are not interrelated, since reading and cognition develop independently in individuals who have dyslexia. "Nerve problems can cause damage to the control of eye muscles which can also cause diplopia." (WEBMD, 2005)

Hyperlexia

Hyperlexic children are characterized by word-reading ability well above what would be expected given their ages and IQs. Hyperlexia can be viewed as a superability in which word recognition ability goes far above expected levels of skill. However, in spite of few problems with decoding, comprehension is poor. Some hyperlexics also have trouble understanding speech. Most or perhaps all children with hyperlexia lie on the autism spectrum. Between 5–10% of autistic children have been estimated to be hyperlexic.

Remediation

Remediation includes both appropriate remedial instruction and classroom accommodations.

See also
Attention deficit hyperactivity disorder
Aphasia
Auditory processing disorder
Developmental coordination disorder
Dyscalculia
Dysgraphia
Orthography
Reading for special needs
Scotopic sensitivity syndrome (also called Irlen Syndrome)
Specific language impairment

References

Learning disabilities
Learning to read

Special education
Educational psychology